Sanjay Gubbi is a conservation biologist based in Karnataka, India. His work focuses on the conservation of large carnivores like tigers and leopards, working on applied aspects and understanding their population biology, proposing conservation policies for their protection, and working to minimize human-wildlife conflict. He currently works as a scientist with Nature Conservation Foundation, a Mysore based NGO.

In 2011, Gubbi received the Carl Zeiss Wildlife Conservation Award and was recognized by the Wildlife Conservation Society. He was also on the ‘25 Leaders of Tomorrow’ list released by Times of India in August 2012 on the eve of India’s 65th year of independence. In 2017 he was conferred with the Whitley Award, popularly called the Green Oscars for his contribution towards the landscape-scale conservation of tigers and other wildlife. In 2019 he was awarded The Co-Existence Award by the Elephant Family, UK for his work on wildlife conservation in India, which was presented by The Prince of Wales and The Duchess of Cornwall.

Some of his most notable work, along with his team, includes working with the government to expand protected areas in Karnataka that has helped protect several wildlife species and habitats. To date, Gubbi has succeeded in adding nearly 3,000 km2 (~745,000 acres) of forested land to the protected area network. This expansion of protected areas in Karnataka has connected 23 protected areas and corridors in the Western Ghats, perhaps marking this as a first of its kind initiative after the 1970s when most protected areas were notified in the country.

Based on his proposal and work new protected areas including Malai Mahadeshwara Wildlife Sanctuary (906 sq.km.), Bukkapatna Chinkara Wildlife Sanctuary (148 sq.km.) and Rangayyanadurga Wildlife Sanctuary (77 sq.km.) among others were notified by the government.

Gubbi has also worked with the government on initiatives to reduce the effects of fragmentation on tiger habitats including the closure of vehicular traffic at night in Nagarahole and Bandipur Tiger Reserves, rerouting highways to outside the tiger reserves, providing alternative roads, stoppage and removal of ill-planned developmental projects from key wildlife habitats, and other similar activities. His work also includes improving social security measures for the frontline staff of the forest department and those affected by human-wildlife conflict.

He is the author of the book titled Second Nature: Saving Tiger Landscapes in the Twenty-First Century which has been hailed as a must-read guide for future conservationists. His books in Kannada include Shaalege Banda Chirate Mattu Itara Kathegalu and Vanyajeevigala Jaadu Hididu

Personal life and education 

Born to Navarathna and Sreyamsha Kumar N.B. in Pavagada on May 12, 1970, Tumkur district in Karnataka, Gubbi's interest in wildlife started at a young age. Tumkur district is covered in dry scrub forests and is home to animals such as leopards, sloth bears, wolves, blackbucks, chinkara (Indian gazelle) and many others. This environment built a natural interest in Gubbi to consider conservation as a full-time career.

In 2006, he finished his Master’s degree in Conservation Biology from the Durrell Institute of Conservation and Ecology, University of Kent where he was awarded the Maurice Swingland Prize for being the best postgraduate student.

Gubbi completed his PhD in Leopard Ecology and Conservation in 2020 from Kuvempu University, Karnataka.

Early career 
Gubbi initially worked as a volunteer for wildlife conservation for nearly a decade before taking it up as a full-time profession in 1998.

He started his full-time career with the Wildlife Conservation Society- India Program before joining Nature Conservation Foundation in 2011 where he now leads a team, to work on large carnivore science and conservation, community-based conservation activities, conservation outreach and human-wildlife conflict in Karnataka. Currently, he is also a member of the Karnataka State Wildlife Board and other wildlife panels of Karnataka.

Gubbi has also taught Master’s program courses at the National Centre for Biological Sciences, the Wildlife Institute of India and Kuvempu University.

He works closely with a wide cross-section of people in the society including policymakers, media personnel, local communities, and social leaders to conserve big cat habitats in the state. Gubbi seeks to combine scientific research with social, cultural and political understanding of wildlife conservation. Along with his team, he also conducts training workshops for print and electronic media, elected representatives and conservation enthusiasts to expand support for conservation.

Currently, his ongoing research focusses on leopards in India and involves population estimation, occupancy surveys, diet studies, and human-leopard conflict. His other initiatives include understanding the impact of highways and roads on wildlife, conservation of forest corridors, providing alternatives for firewood to local communities in and around forests and conducting outreach programmes aimed at improving awareness on wildlife conservation and mitigating human-wildlife conflict.

Other work 

Sanjay Gubbi has worked with the government to delineate eco-sensitive zones around protected areas and tiger reserves in Karnataka. Bandipur was the first tiger reserve in the country to receive the final notification of an eco-sensitive zone due to the collaborative work done with the local elected representatives and forest officials.

He also helped reduce the fragmentation effects of unsustainable mining in Kudremukh National Park and energy projects in critical corridors in the Western Ghats.

As part of the outreach initiatives, Sanjay Gubbi’s efforts led to the establishment of the Holematthi Nature Information Center near Hanur, Kollegal district in Karnataka which regularly hosts student groups from local schools as part of wildlife-awareness programmes. The Nature Information Center also conducts workshops for trainees and frontline staff of the Forest Department, teachers, and media personnel.

Publications 

Gubbi has authored several scientific papers in international peer-reviewed journals. He has also authored two books on wildlife in Kannada, and one in English.

Research articles 

Gubbi, S., Kolekar, A., & Kumara, V. (2021) Quantifying Wire Snares as a Threat to Leopards in Karnataka, India. Tropical Conservation Science. 14, 19400829211023264
 Snider, M.H., Athreya, V.R., Balme, G.A., Bidner, L.R., Farhadinia, M.S., Fattebert, J., Gompper, M.E., Gubbi, S., Hunter, L.T.B., Isbell, L.A., Macdonald, D.W., Odden, M., Owen, C.R., Slotow, R., Spalton, J.A., Stein, A.B., Steyn, V., Vanak, A.T., Weise, F.J., Wilmers, C.C., Kays, R. (2021) Home range variation in leopards living across the human density gradient. Journal of Mammalogy. 102 (4), 1138–1148. doi.org/10.1093/jmammal/gyab068
 Gubbi, S., Ramesh, S., Menon, A.M., Girish, M.N., Poornesha, H.C. (2020) The lone wolf: new distribution update of the Indian grey wolf (Canis lupus pallipes) in southern India. Canid Biology & Conservation. 22(6), 21-24. URL: http://www.canids.org/CBC/22/Indian_grey_wolf_distribution.pdf.
 Gubbi, S., Sharma, K., & Kumara, V. (2020) Every hill has its leopard: Patterns of space use by leopards (Panthera pardus) in a mixed use landscape in India. PeerJ. 8:e10072 https://doi.org/10.7717/peerj.10072
 Gubbi, S., Kolekar, A., & Kumara, V. (2020) Policy to on-ground action: Evaluating a conflict policy guideline for leopards in India. Journal of International Wildlife Law & Policy. 23, 127-140. doi: 10.1080/13880292.2020.1818428
 Suthar, S., Menon, A., & Gubbi, S. (2020) An extension of known range of Brown Mongoose Urva fuscus from Southern India. Small Carnivore Conservation. 58, e58007
 Gubbi, S., Kolekar, A., Chakraborty, P., & Kumar, V. (2020) Big cat in well: an unconventional threat to leopards in southern India. Oryx. doi:10.1017/S0030605319000280
 Gubbi, S., Seshadri, S., Harish, N. S., Chandra, S. K. (2019) Counting the unmarked: Estimating animal population using count data. Electronic Journal of Applied Statistical Analysis. 12, 604-613, doi: 10.1285/i20705948v12n3p604
 Khawaja, H. et al. (2019) Pangolins in global camera trap data: implications for ecological monitoring. Global Ecology & Conservation. 20, doi.org/10.1016/j.gecco.2019.e00769
 Puyravaud, J.P., Gubbi, S., Poornesha, H.C., Davidar, P. (2019) Deforestation increases frequency of incidents with elephants (Elephas maximus). Tropical Conservation Science. 12, 1-11, doi.org/10.1177/1940082919865959
 Gubbi, S., Nagashettihalli, H., Kolekar, A., Poornesha, H. C., Reddy, V., Mumtaz, J., & Madhusudan, M. D. (2017) From intent to action: a case study for the expansion of tiger conservation from southern India. Global Ecology & Conservation. 9, 11-20.
 Lingaraja, S. S., Chowdhary, S., Bhat, R., & Gubbi, S. (2017) Evaluating a survey landscape for tiger abundance in the confluence of the Western and Eastern Ghats. Current Science. 113, 1759 - 1763.
 Gubbi, S., Mukherjee. K, Swaminath. M.H., and Poornesha. H.C. (2016) Providing more protected space for tigers in the Western Ghats, southern India. Oryx. 50, 336 – 343. 
 Gubbi, S., and Poornesha H.C. (2015) Finding the middle road: grounded approaches to mitigate highway impacts in tiger reserves in Handbook of Road Ecology: A practitioner’s guide to impacts and mitigation. Eds. van der Ree. R, Smith, D. J., and Grilo. C, John Wiley & Sons, Oxford, UK. 317-321.
 Madhusudan, M. D., Sharma, N., Raghunath, R., Baskaran, N., Bipin, C.M., Gubbi, S., Johnsingh, A.J.T., Kulkarni, J., Kumara, H.N., Mehta, P., Pillay, R., & Sukumar, R. (2015) Distribution, relative abundance, and conservation status of a globally significant Asian elephant population in Karnataka, southern India. Biological Conservation.187, 34-40.
 Mondol. S, Sridhar, V., Yadav, P., Gubbi, S., Ramakrishnan, U. (2014) Tracing the geographic origin of traded leopard body parts in the Indian subcontinent. Conservation Biology. 29(6), 556-564.
 Gubbi, S., Reddy, V., Nagashettihalli, H. and Bhat, R. (2014) Photographic record of the Ratel Mellivora capensis from the southern Indian state of Karnataka. Small Carnivore Conservation. 50, 42-44. 
 Gubbi, S., Poornesha, H. C., Daithota, A. and Nagashettihalli, H. (2014) Roads emerging as a critical threat to leopards in India? CatNews. 60, 30-31. 
 Gubbi, S., Swaminath, M.H., Poornesha, H.C., Bhat. R and Raghunath. R. (2014) An elephantine challenge: human-elephant conflict distribution in the largest Asian elephant population, southern India. Biodiversity and Conservation. 23(3), 633-647.
 Gubbi, S., and Poornesha, H.C. (2013). Joint Indian initiative creates tiger corridor. Nature. 500, 29.
 Harihar. A, Chanchani. P, Subedie. N, Sharma R.K., Vattekaven. J, Gubbi. S, Pandav. B and Noon. B, (2013) Conflating “co-occurrence” with “coexistence”. Proceedings of the National Academy of Sciences, USA. 110(8), E109.
 Gubbi, S. (2012) Patterns and correlates of human-elephant conflict around an Indian reserve. Biological Conservation. 148(1), 88-95.
 Gubbi, S. and Linkie, M. (2012) Characterising wildlife hunting patterns in India: A case study from Periyar Tiger Reserve. Journal of Bombay Natural History Society. 109(3), 165-172.
 Gubbi, S., Poornesha, H.C. and Madhusudhan, M.D. (2012). Impact of vehicular traffic on the use of highway-edges by large mammals in a south Indian wildlife reserve. Current Science. 102(7), 1047-1051.
 Gubbi, S. (2010) Making governance effective. Seminar. 613, 61-65.
 Gubbi, S. (2010) Are conservation funds degrading wildlife habitats? Economic and Political Weekly. XLV (26&27), 22-25. 
 Gubbi, S., Kumar. R and Akarsha B.M. (2009) Two new records of distribution of four-horned antelope Tetracerus quadricornis. Journal of Bombay Natural History Society. 105(3), 187-189.
 Gubbi, S., Linkie. M and Leader-Williams, N. (2009) Evaluating the legacy of an integrated conservation and development project around a tiger reserve in India. Environmental Conservation. 35(4), 331-339.
 Gubbi, S. and MacMillan. D.C. (2008) Can non-timber forest products solve livelihood problems? A case study from Periyar Tiger Reserve, India. Oryx. 42(2), 222-228.

Books and others 

 Leopard Diaries: The Rosette in India
 Gubbi, S., Poornesha, H. C. (2020). Land of the Honey Badger, Mysore, India; Nature Conservation Foundation.
 Second Nature: Saving Tiger Landscapes in the Twenty-First Century 
 Shaalege Banda Chirate Mattu Itara Kathegalu (The leopard that came to the school and other stories)
 Vanyajeevigala Jaadu Hididu (On the trail of wildlife) 
 Vanyajeevigala Ramya Loka (The Delightful World of Wildlife) [Co editor]
 I was attacked by a leopard 
 Highway for tigers

References 

Conservation biologists
Living people
Indian biologists
Year of birth missing (living people)